Public Opinion is a 1935 American drama film directed by Frank R. Strayer and starring Lois Wilson, Crane Wilbur and Shirley Grey.

Cast
 Lois Wilson as Mona Trevor / Anne Trevor  
 Crane Wilbur as Paul Arnold  
 Shirley Grey as Joan Nash  
 Luis Alberni as Caparini  
 Andrés de Segurola as Enrico Martinelli  
 Paul Ellis as Carlos Duran  
 Ronnie Cosby as Tommy Arnold  
 Florence Roberts as Mrs. Buttons  
 Gertrude Sutton as Martha, the Maid  
 Erville Alderson as Mr. Trevor  
 Edward Keane as Paul's Attorney  
 Mildred Gover as Maid  
 Edward LeSaint as Judge  
 Richard Carlyle as Dr. Rand

References

Bibliography
 Michael R. Pitts. Poverty Row Studios, 1929–1940: An Illustrated History of 55 Independent Film Companies, with a Filmography for Each. McFarland & Company, 2005.

External links
 

1935 films
1935 drama films
American drama films
Films directed by Frank R. Strayer
Chesterfield Pictures films
American black-and-white films
1930s English-language films
1930s American films